This is a "list of licensed credit institution in Uganda". 

 Mercantile Credit Bank
 Top Finance Bank Uganda Limited
 BRAC Uganda Bank Limited
 Yako Bank Uganda Limited

See also
 Banking in Uganda
 List of banks in Uganda
 List of Microfinance Deposit-taking Institutions in Uganda
 List of companies based in Uganda

References

External links
The Financial Sector In Uganda

Credit institutions
Finance in Uganda